The discography of Paul Heaton, a solo artist previously a member of The Housemartins and The Beautiful South, consists of nine studio albums. Paul Heaton's first solo release was "Mitch", released under the banner of Biscuit Boy.

Albums

Studio albums

Compilation albums

Singles

References

Heaton, Paul discography